Oliver Donnovan Gibson (born March 15, 1972 in Chicago, Illinois) is a retired American professional football defensive tackle in the National Football League. He was originally drafted by the Pittsburgh Steelers in the fourth round of the 1995 NFL Draft. He played from 1995–2003 for the Steelers and Cincinnati Bengals. He played college football at the University of Notre Dame.

In 1989, Gibson was named USA Today High School Football Defensive Player of the Year.

1972 births
Living people
American football defensive tackles
Notre Dame Fighting Irish football players
Pittsburgh Steelers players
Cincinnati Bengals players
Players of American football from Chicago
People from Romeoville, Illinois